Inside the Vatican is a monthly magazine relating to issues within the Roman Curia, at the Vatican in Rome, which is at the very heart of the Roman Catholic Church and Christianity as a whole.

History and profile
Inside the Vatican is published ten times a year, having begun its first publication in April 1993. The magazine has an editorial office in Front Royal, VA. It claims a readership of 17,500 and a circulation of 15,000, primarily in the US and Canada. 

The magazine attempts to fully analyze the impact of the Holy See in the modern world and its role in the spiritual life of the Church's flock.

References

External links
 

1993 establishments in Italy
Religious magazines published in the United States
Magazines established in 1993
Magazines published in Virginia
Catholic magazines